Kehial is an area of Bagh Union Council, Abbottabad Tehsil, Abbottabad District, Khyber Pakhtunkhwa, Pakistan. According to the 2017 Census of Pakistan,   the population of Kehial is 5,218.

References

Populated places in Abbottabad District